Paolo Samorì (born in Imola, Italy, 3 May 1971) is an Italian physical chemist and Distinguished Professor (PRCE) and director of the Institut de Science et d'Ingénierie Supramoléculaires (ISIS) of the Université de Strasbourg (UNISTRA) & CNRS where he is also head of the Nanochemistry Laboratory.

Education
He obtained a Laurea (master's degree) in Industrial Chemistry at University of Bologna in 1995. In 2000 he received his PhD in Chemistry from the Humboldt-Universität zu Berlin (Prof. Jürgen P. Rabe). He was permanent research scientist at Istituto per la Sintesi Organica e la Fotoreattività of the Consiglio Nazionale delle Ricerche of Bologna from 2001 till 2008, and Visiting Professor at ISIS from 2003 til 2008.

Career and research
He has published over 415 papers on applications of nanochemistry and materials science with a particular focus on graphene and related 2D materials,  supramolecular electronics, scanning probe microscopies beyond imaging, hierarchical self-assembly of hybrid functional architectures at surfaces and interfaces, and the fabrication of organic- and graphene-based nanodevices.These papers have been cited over 25,000 times, leading to a h-index of 85.

He is using the supramolecular chemistry approach in order to generate ordered 1D, 2D and 3D architectures at surfaces and interfaces, with the ultimate goal of controlling an improving the properties of opto-electronic and sensing devices.

He exploited supramolecular scaffolds based on H-bonding and metal-ligand interactions to control the patterning of functional groups in two-dimensions. He has fabricated the first dynamer operating at the solid-liquid interface which were monitored on the sub-molecular scale by means of Scanning Tunneling Microscopy

At the University of Strasbourg he showed that combining organic semiconductors with photochromic systems it is possible to fabricate optically switchable field-effect transistor as a first step towards multifunctional devices. Such research enabled him to fabricate both flexible non-volatile optical memory thin-film transistor devices with over 256 distinct levels based on an organic bicomponent blend, and optically switchable organic light-emitting transistors capable of emitting light in the range of the three primary RGB colors with the special feature of being capable of developing writable and erasable spatially defined patterns  He is exploiting supramolecular methods to generate graphene based materials with tunable properties. For example, he was able to impart a light-responsive nature to 2D materials like graphene and MoS2 by combining them with stimuli-responsive molecules (like photochromic systems or electrochemical switches), even by means of the asymmetric functionalization of the two surfaces of the 2D materials, to realize multi-responsive and high-performance hybrid optoelectronic devices by mastering a more than Moore strategy. His current research is focused on the architecture vs function relationship in supramolecular and graphene-based materials for applications in (opto)electronics, chemical and physical sensing, energy storage and materials science, thereby addressing global challenges.

His present research interests are centered around internet of functions in ad hoc 0D to 3D functionalized multicomponent nanostructures and networks thereof for energy, sensing and optoelectronic applications.

 Chemistry of two-dimensional materials (graphene and other layered compounds): production, tuning of their properties, fabrication of devices.
 Multiscale tailoring of smart supramolecular systems: development of multiresponsive coatings and composites.
 High-performance multifunctional materials and (nano)devices for opto-electronics, chemical and physical sensing, data storage, energy generation and storage, etc.

In 2021 the Presidency of the Council of Ministers of Italy has appointed him Ufficiale Ordine al Merito della Repubblica Italiana.
He is Fellow of the Royal Society of Chemistry (FRSC), fellow of the European Academy of Sciences (EURASC), member of the Academia Europaea (MAE), foreign member of the Royal Flemish Academy of Belgium for Science and the Arts (KVAB), and senior member of the Institut Universitaire de France (IUF).

Awards 
 young scientist award - European Materials Research Society (1998) 
 young scientist award - Materials Research Society (2000) 
 IUPAC Prize for Young Chemists 2001
 "Vincenzo Caglioti" award 2006 granted by the Accademia Nazionale dei Lincei
 "Nicolò Copernico" award 2009 (Italy) for his discoveries in the field of nanoscience and nanotechnology
 "Guy Ourisson" award 2010 of the Cercle Gutenberg (France)
 junior member of the Institut Universitaire de France (IUF) 2010
 European Research Council Starting Grant 2010 
 Royal Society of Chemistry - Fellow (FRSC) 2011
 CNRS Silver Medal 2012.
 Elected member of the Academia Europaea (MAE) 2014
 Elected fellow of the European Academy of Sciences 2014
 Honorary Member of the University of Nova Gorica, Slovenia 2017
 European Research Council Proof-of-Concept 2017
 Catalan-Sabatier-Award (Spanish Royal Society of Chemistry) 2017
 Grignard Wittig Lecture (German Chemical Society) 2017
 Royal Society of Chemistry - Surfaces and Interfaces Award 2018
 Blaise Pascal Medal in Materials Science (EURASC)
 Advisory Professor Shanghai Jiao Tong University, China 2018
 Grand Prix Pierre Süe Société Chimique de France 2018
 Elected foreign member of the Royal Flemish Academy of Belgium for Science and the Arts (KVAB) 2019
 European Research Council Advanced Grant 2019
 "Les Étoiles de l’Europe" award - French Ministry of Higher Education, Research and Innovation
 European Research Council Proof-of-Concept 2020
 Fellow of the Institute of Advanced Studies (USIAS), Université de Strasbourg (UNISTRA) 2020
 senior member of the Institut Universitaire de France (IUF) 2020
 Royal Society of Chemistry - Société Chimique de France Lectureship in Chemical Sciences 2020
 Fellow of the Materials Research Society (MRS) 2021
 Distinguished Fellow of International Engineering and Technology Institute (IETI) 2022
 Elected member of the European_Academy_of_Sciences_and_Arts 2022
 Prix André Collet, Groupe de Chimie Supramoléculaire Société Chimique de France 2022

Associate editor 
 Nanoscale (Royal Society of Chemistry), 2018–present
 Nanoscale Advances (Royal Society of Chemistry), 2019–present

Member to the advisory boards 
 Advanced Materials (Wiley-VCH), 2006-now
 Journal of Materials Chemistry (Royal Society of Chemistry), 2008-now
 Nanoscale (Royal Society of Chemistry), 2009-2017
 Small (Wiley-VCH), 2012-now
 ChemPhysChem (Wiley-VCH), 2011-now
 ChemPlusChem (Wiley-VCH), 2011-now
 Chemical Communications (Royal Society of Chemistry), 2012-now
 Chemical Society Reviews (Royal Society of Chemistry), 2013-now
 ACS Omega (American Chemical Society), 2016-now
 ACS Nano (American Chemical Society), 2017-now
 ChemNanoMat (Wiley-VCH), 2018-now
 ChemSystemsChem (Wiley-VCH), 2018-now
 Nanoscale Horizons (Royal Society of Chemistry), 2019-now
 SmartMat (Wiley-VCH), 2020-now

References

External links 

  Nanochemistry Lab webpage

1971 births
Living people
Italian nanotechnologists
University of Bologna alumni
Humboldt University of Berlin alumni
Italian physical chemists
Italian expatriates in France
Academic staff of the University of Strasbourg
National Research Council (Italy) people
Research directors of the French National Centre for Scientific Research